Aghamore is a village in County Leitrim, Ireland

Aghamore may also refer to:

Places
Northern Ireland
Aghamore, County Fermanagh, a townland in the civil parish of Inishmacsaint
Aghamore, County Tyrone, a townland in the civil parish of Termonamongan

Republic of Ireland
Aghamore, Croghan, a townland in the barony of Lower Philipstown, County Offaly
Aghamore, Killucan, a townland in the barony of Farbill, County Westmeath
Aghamore, Kilbeggan, a townland in the barony of Moycashel, County Westmeath
Aghamore, Kilbride, a townland in the barony of Kilcoursey, County Offaly
Aghamore, County Mayo, a village and parish in County Mayo
Aghamore GAA, a Gaelic Athletic Association club in the parish of Aghamore, just outside Knock village in County Mayo